In the music industry, the Top 40 is the current, 40 most-popular songs in a particular genre. It is the best-selling or most frequently broadcast popular music. Record charts have traditionally consisted of a total of 40 songs. "Top 40" or "contemporary hit radio" is also a radio format. Frequent variants of the Top 40 are the Top 10, Top 20, Top 30, Top 50, Top 75, Top 100 and Top 200.

History
According to producer Richard Fatherley, Todd Storz was the inventor of the format, at his radio station KOWH in Omaha, Nebraska. Storz invented the format in the early 1950s, using the number of times a record was played on jukeboxes to compose a weekly list for broadcast. The format was commercially successful, and Storz and his father Robert, under the name of the Storz Broadcasting Company, subsequently acquired other stations to use the new Top 40 format. In 1989, Todd Storz was inducted into the Nebraska Broadcasters Association Hall of Fame.

The term "Top 40", describing a radio format, appeared in 1960. The Top 40, whether surveyed by a radio station or a publication, was a list of songs that shared only the common characteristic of being newly released. Its introduction coincided with a transition from the old ten-inch 78 rpm record format for single "pop" recordings to the seven-inch vinyl 45 rpm format, introduced in 1949, which was outselling it by 1954 and soon replaced it completely in 1958. The Top 40 thereafter became a survey of the popularity of 45 rpm singles and their airplay on the radio.  Some nationally syndicated radio shows, such as American Top 40, featured a countdown of the 40 highest ranked songs on a particular music or entertainment publication.  Although such publications often listed more than 40 charted hits, such as the Billboard Hot 100, time constraints allowed for the airing of only 40 songs; hence, the term "top 40" gradually became part of the vernacular associated with popular music.

An article in the Spring 2012 issue of Nebraska History magazine offered this comment as to Todd Storz' legacy: "the radio revolution that Storz began with KOWH was already sweeping the nation. Thousands of radio station owners had realized the enormous potential for a new kind of radio. When television became popular, social monitors predicted that radio would die. However, because of the invention of Storz and others like him, radio would be reborn".

Storz is credited by some sources as helping to popularize rock and roll music. By the mid-1950s, his station, and the numerous others which eventually adopted the Top 40 format, were playing records by artists such as "Presley, Lewis, Haley, Berry and Domino".

From the 1980s onwards, different recording formats have competed with the 45 rpm vinyl record. This includes cassette singles, CD singles, digital downloads and streaming. Many music charts changed their eligibility rules to incorporate some, or all, of these.

Some disc jockeys presenting Top 40 and similar format programs have been implicated in various payola scandals.

Music charts  

Music charts and various radio programs adopt different chart formats including Top 10, 20, 30, 40, 50, 75, 100 and 200 although radio formats usually restrict to the Top 40 wherever the chart contains more than 40 songs.

Radio format

Top 40 is also adopted to a radio format called Top 40 format, spinning mainly hits appearing in the official Top 40 charts of the country in addition to some upcoming hits that are greatly expected to get into the Top 40 imminently. The format is variously known also as CHR (contemporary hit radio), contemporary hits, hit list, current hits, hit music, top 40, or pop radio.

See also

Contemporary hit radio
Mainstream Top 40

References

Further reading 
 Pete Battistini, "American Top 40 with Casey Kasem The 1970s", Authorhouse.com, January 31, 2005. 
 Susan Douglas, Listening In: Radio and the American Imagination (New York: Times Books, 1999)
 
 
 Ben Fong-Torres, The Hits Just Keep On Coming: The History of Top 40 Radio (San Francisco: Backbeat Books, 1998)
 Elwood F. 'Woody' Goulart, The Mystique and Mass Persuasion: Bill Drake & Gene Chenault’s Rock and Roll Radio Programming (2006)
 David MacFarland, The Development of the Top 40 Radio Format (New York: Arno Press, 1979)

External links 
 Public Radio documentary featuring a history of Top 40

Pop music
Record charts
Radio formats